Flemyng is a surname. Notable persons with that name include:

Gordon Flemyng (1934–1995), Scottish film and television director
Jason Flemyng (born 1966), English actor
Robert Flemyng (1912–1995), British actor

See also
Fleming (disambiguation)
Flemming (disambiguation)